"Show Me Love" is a song officially credited as being performed by American singer Robin S. and written by Allen George and Fred McFarlane, originally released in 1990 by Champion Records in the United Kingdom. In 1992, it was remixed by Swedish house music production duo StoneBridge and Nick Nice, and re-released in many European countries as well as the United States and Japan. It became one of the most well known house anthems in the United Kingdom, and Robin's biggest hit to date. It helped to make house more mainstream. In 1993, it was included on Robin S.'s debut album of the same name. Confusion arose with the 1997 hit "Show Me Love" by Swedish singer Robyn, due to their homonymous names and identical titles. 

In the US, "Show Me Love" reached number five on the Billboard Hot 100, number seven on the R&B chart, and number one on the dance club chart. It was certified gold by the Recording Industry Association of America and sold 600,000 copies domestically. Additionally, the song went to number six on the UK Singles Chart in April 1993.

Background and creation
The original version of "Show Me Love", released in 1990 on British label Champion Records, is officially credited as being written by Allen George and Fred McFarlane and performed by Robin S. Initially reluctant to sign on due to its fast tempo given her prior background in solely R&B and pop, Robin struggled through the recording process as heard in the hoarseness and frustration on the final track as she was recovering from the flu. Despite asking Allen for publishing credits for what she claimed to be her own ad-libbed additions to the original demo for years, Robin never received them.

In 1992, Swedish DJ and producer StoneBridge contacted Champion, looking for songs to remix; they suggested "Show Me Love". After they rejected several remixes, StoneBridge created a new mix after hearing contributing musician Richard Tomlinson's demo using the "organ" preset on the Korg M1 synthesiser to create the distorted bassline. A few days later, he listened to the remix again; he thought it was "pretty bad", but he was persuaded by his girlfriend to submit it. StoneBridge recalls this process:

StoneBridge only learned his remix was a global hit months after its release during a visit to London when he turned on the weekly TV show Top of the Pops. He also regretted never being given writing credits for the remix he went on to describe as "basically compos[ing] a new track" as the "world of remixes" at that time also tended towards "work for hire" which he felt in his situation was eventually "forgiven" as he got a "lot of work" afterwards.

Following an ASCAP panel in 2011 with musician Andrea Martin, initial reporting indicated that Andrea had claimed that during her time as a then "very popular" demo session vocalist, her entire melody and vocal sent for the track to Rondo Publishing in the UK was used for the official recording in place of Robin S. but neither was ever credited. 

Following her death in 2021, longtime songwriting partner to Andrea, Ivan Matias, clarified to Billboard in 2022 that her comments at that panel had been widely misinterpreted for years and that while Andrea had written the entire melody and vocal arrangement as well as sung the demo, it was in fact Robin's vocal on the final recording. Record executive Joey Carvello, who had licensed the remix from Champion for Atlantic Records at the time, substantiated Matias' comments to the same outlet. For the demo Andrea took a one-time $300 fee for her contribution rather than asking for writing credits which would have entitled her to publishing income, a decision they said she regretted for years and blamed on her naivete of the then-common industry practice.

Commercial performance
In the United States, the 1992 remix of the track peaked at number five on the Billboard Hot 100 on June 12, 1993. And on the Hot Dance Club Songs chart, it peaked at number one, on May 8, 1993. "Show Me Love" also peaked at number seven on the Hot R&B/Hip-Hop Songs chart. It was certified gold by the Recording Industry Association of America and sold 600,000 copies domestically. In Canada, the single peaked at number two on the RPM Dance/Urban chart.

In Europe, in the United Kingdom, the song debuted at number 66 on the UK Singles Chart, and peaked at number six on April 4, 7 weeks later. It also reached number two in Spain, number nine in Belgium and Switzerland, as well as number ten in Sweden. It was a top 20 hit in Austria (15), Denmark (20), France (14), Germany (11), Iceland (14), Italy (17), and the Netherlands (13). On the European Hot 100 Singles, "Show Me Love" reached number 26 on September 25. Outside Europe, the song peaked at number six in Zimbabwe, number 13 in Israel, and in 1994, number 78 in Australia.

Critical reception
AllMusic editor Alex Henderson noted that Robin S. is "greatly influenced" by Evelyn "Champagne" King, "but obviously her own person". He added further that the success of her "sleek yet gritty hits", as "Show Me Love", led many to think of Robin as a "dance-floor diva." J.D. Considine from The Baltimore Sun complimented the song as one of the "best moments" on the album, describing it as a "stomping, bass-driven" tune. Larry Flick from Billboard wrote, "Here's a bit of diva-house with a slight twist. Robin's big, finger-wavin' performance is laid atop an understated arrangement of icy cool electro beats." M.R. Martinez from Cash Box stated that "Show Me Love" "will become a testament to any dance floor DJ." A writer for Complex deemed it as "pure" and "powerful". Anderson Jones from Entertainment Weekly described it as a "techno-tinged house tune." Joe Muggs from Fact wrote that "for all its poppiness, this is a dark, fierce, attitude-filled beast of a record." Howard Cohen from Knight-Ridder Newspapers stated, "Distinctive, burbling keyboard pattern and rich singing infuse this house classic. A must." Pan-European magazine Music & Media remarked its spine of "buzzing synth bass lines and synthesised xylophone" by the "American dance prima donna". 

Alan Jones from Music Week stated on the 1997 re-release, that the track "is widely recognised as one of the classic dance tracks of the Nineties and the original can't be improved on, but our old friend "public demand" has apparently forced a re-release." He added, "Reserve a place in the upper echelons of the chart." A reviewer from The Orlando Sentinel viewed it as "hard-driving". Jeremy Helligar from People Magazine remarked that the singer "sounded so caught up in the rapture of the rhythm that listeners couldn't help following suit." Popdust noted "that gorgeous, glorious riff", adding that Robin S. "sounds shell-shocked and devastated, like she's pleading for her guy to show her love, because she just doesn't know if she can take another crushing disappointment. It's very dark, and could have been overwhelmingly dour, if not for the snare-and-hi-hate shuffle that keeps propelling the song forward." Rob Sheffield from Spin declared it as "great", remarking its "haunting synth-riff". TMZ described it as "infectious", praising the singer as "a singing icon in the '90s club scene."

Music video
A music video was produced to promote the single, which sees Robin S. performing in a club. It was directed by American music video, television, and film director Millicent Shelton. It starts with a young woman arriving at a nightclub in which Robin S. begins to sing on a stage in front of a crowd. She is backed up by a male dancer. The woman goes to the bar where she meets a young man who buys her a drink. When the chorus comes, some drag queens in the club are lip syncing to it. People are dancing everywhere, while the two are enjoying themselves at the bar. Then they are interrupted by an elderly man trying to talk to the woman. She is not interested and in the scuffle, her pearl band breaks. All the pearls roll down on the floor, while she runs from the bar. The young man picks up some of the pearls and goes out to the woman. Then he puts them in her hand and kisses her. While Robin S. sings the last stanzas of the song, they leave the nightclub together. The video was later published on YouTube in June 2010, and had generated more than 63 million views as of January 2023.

Impact and legacy
The song made it to the top five on the Billboard Hot 100 in the United States, a rare feat for a house song at the time. According to The Guardian, "Show Me Love" has influenced contemporary house songs such as Kiesza's "Hideaway" (2014) and Disclosure's "White Noise" (2013), and artists such as Clean Bandit and Felix Jaehn. In 2000, VH1 placed "Show Me Love" at number 73 in its list of 100 Greatest Dance Songs.

In 2006, Slant Magazine ranked the song 41st in its "100 Greatest Dance Songs" list, adding,

In 2011, The Guardian featured the song in its "A History of Modern Music: Dance".

In 2014, Complex included the song in their "Songs Every Dance Music Fan Should Know, Vol. 1", stating that "it's a perfect track." They wrote,

"Show Me Love" was sampled in the Charli XCX song "Used to Know Me" from her 2022 album Crash.

The song was also prominently sampled in Beyoncé's 2022 single "Break My Soul". As a direct result, various record labels, corporations, and other artists inquired about licensing the song's master recordings for various purposes. Robin S. further praised Beyoncé for acknowledging and appreciating her music, calling it "one of the highest compliments ever."

Accolades

(*) indicates the list is unordered.

Track listings

 Tracks 1 & 4 mixed by Anthony King.

 Additional production by StoneBridge. Remixes by Nick Nice & StoneBridge.

Charts and certifications

Weekly charts

Year-end charts

Certifications

Release history

Personnel
 Producer – Allen George, Fred McFarlane
 Co-producer – StoneBridge
 Mix – StoneBridge, P. Dennis Mitchell, Junior Vasquez
 Arrangement – Andrea Martin (uncredited) 
 Engineer – P. Dennis Mitchell, Dave Sussman, Nat Foster, Robert Kiss
 Keyboards – Fred McFarlane, Richard Tomlinson, Joe Moskowitz, Matt Thomas, Stonebridge, Robert Kiss
 Guitar – Paul Jackson Jr., Dana Reed, Mike Cantwell
 Backing vocals – Dana Reed, Debbie Cole, Dennis Taylor, Kim Miller, Luci Martin, Robin Stone, Vivian Sessoms

Track listing

Charts

Steve Angello and Laidback Luke version

In 2008, following the successful sample of the Mobin Master cover mashup with their song, "Be", Swedish DJ and producer Steve Angello and Filipino-Dutch DJ Laidback Luke used the parts to reconstruct their mashup. Robin S. is featured re-recording her vocals, engineered and co-produced by Mobin Master, which was initially recorded for his version. Also featured are additional vocals from Hal Ritson (co-producer) and Yolanda Quartey. It was originally released through the Happy Music label on December 12, and has had multiple re-releases since. "Show Me Love" is one of Angello's and Luke's best known singles, especially in the United Kingdom where it topped the UK Dance Chart in 2009.

The song was also an international breakthrough for Dutch DJ Hardwell. The song is based on his illegal bootleg mashup of Mobin Master's cover of "Show Me Love", with vocalist Karina Chavez and the instrumental track "Be" by Steve Angello & Laidback Luke.

Track listing

 Includes the video of "Show Me Love" (3:08).

Charts

Weekly charts

Year-end charts

Certifications

Sam Feldt version

In 2015, the song was remade by producer Sam Feldt featuring vocals from Kimberly Anne.  It was released as a digital download on 16 February 2015 through Spinnin' Records.  Several remixes were released on 21 June 2015, including EDX's Indian Summer Remix, which became most popular.

Track listing

Charts

Weekly charts

Year-end charts

Certifications

Release history

References

External links
 

1990 debut singles
1992 singles
1993 singles
2002 singles
2008 singles
Robin S. songs
Ministry of Sound singles
1990 songs
Champion Records singles
ZYX Music singles
Ultra Music singles
Big Beat Records (American record label) singles
Sam Feldt songs
Songs written by Fred McFarlane
Dutch Top 40 number-one singles
Music Week number-one dance singles